The Seattle SuperSonics (commonly known as the Sonics) were an American professional basketball team based in Seattle, Washington. They played in the Pacific and Northwest Divisions of the National Basketball Association (NBA) from 1967 until 2008. After the 2007–08 season ended, the team relocated to Oklahoma City, Oklahoma, and now plays as the Oklahoma City Thunder. In 41 seasons, they reached the postseason 22 times, where they reached the NBA Finals three times and won it once.

Table key

Seasons

All-time records
Note: Statistics are correct as of the conclusion of the 2007–08 NBA season.

See also
 List of Oklahoma City Thunder seasons

Notes

References
General

Specific

 
Seattle SuperSonics
Seattle SuperSonics